For the Australian former footballer, see Evan Berger.

Evan Berger  (born April 2, 1960) is a Canadian politician and former Member of the Legislative Assembly of Alberta. He represented the constituency of Livingstone-Macleod as a Progressive Conservative from 2008 to 2012.

Early life
Berger was born April 2, 1960 in High River. He was raised on a mixed ranch farm in the foothills southwest of Nanton, Alberta. After high school, Berger entered the Southern Alberta Institute of Technology (SAIT) in Calgary, but left to pursue a land purchase opportunity. He has been involved in the agriculture industry since.

Political life
Berger won his seat in the 2008 provincial election with 64 per cent of the vote in the constituency of Livingstone-Macleod. He currently serves as Parliamentary Assistant to the Minister of Sustainable Resource Development and sits on the Cabinet Policy Committee on Resources and the Environment. Berger chaired the Land-use Framework MLA Committee. He was a member of the Standing Committee on Resource and Environment; the Standing Committee on Privileges and Elections, Standing Orders and Printing; and the First Nations/Metis/Inuit Workforce Action Plan MLA Committee.

Prior to becoming an MLA, Berger spent nearly 16 years in municipal politics, as a member of council in the municipal district of Willow Creek. During his council terms, he served as reeve for nine years and spent six years as chair of the Municipal Planning Commission and the Agricultural Service Board.

By a vote margin of less than 1,200 votes, Mr. Berger was defeated by Wildrose candidate Pat Stier in April, 2012. Alberta Premier Alison Redford appointed Berger to a position paying approximately $150,000 per year a few months after his defeat. He remained a member of the PC Party and ran again for his old seat during the 2015 election. During the campaign, Premier Jim Prentice appeared alongside Berger during his campaign. Berger once again lost to Stier on election day.

Personal life
Berger lives in Nanton with his wife, Laurie, and their three children: Talia, Brita and Joel. He is still actively involved in agriculture, but has cut back on his workload by letting go of rented land and paring down his cow herd.

Electoral results

References

External links
Evan Berger Campaign (copy archived June 2019)

1960 births
Living people
Mayors of places in Alberta
Members of the Executive Council of Alberta
People from High River
Progressive Conservative Association of Alberta MLAs
Southern Alberta Institute of Technology alumni
21st-century Canadian politicians